Thomas Enqvist defeated Yevgeny Kafelnikov in the final, 6–2, 6–4, 7–5 to win the singles tennis title at the 1996 Paris Open.

Pete Sampras was the defending champion, but lost in the second round to Marc Rosset.

Seeds
A champion seed is indicated in bold text while text in italics indicates the round in which that seed was eliminated. All sixteen seeds received a bye into the second round.

  Pete Sampras (second round)
  Michael Chang (third round)
  Thomas Muster (second round)
  Yevgeny Kafelnikov (final)
  Goran Ivanišević (second round)
  Boris Becker (second round)
  Richard Krajicek (second round)
  Wayne Ferreira (third round)
  Andre Agassi (second round)
  Marcelo Ríos (second round)
  Todd Martin (third round)
  Thomas Enqvist (champion)
  MaliVai Washington (third round)
  Albert Costa (second round)
  Jim Courier (second round)
  Félix Mantilla (third round)

Draw

Finals

Top half

Section 1

Section 2

Bottom half

Section 3

Section 4

External links
 1996 Paris Open draw

1996 Paris Open
1996 ATP Tour